Sluda is a rural locality (a village) in Tarnogskoye Rural Settlement, Tarnogsky District, Vologda Oblast, Russia. The population was 316 as of 2002. There are 5 streets.

Geography 
Sluda is located 6 km northeast of Tarnogsky Gorodok (the district's administrative centre) by road. Mikheyevskaya is the nearest rural locality.

References 

Rural localities in Tarnogsky District